Bart Klomp (born November 25, 1999) is a Dutch curler.

Teams

Men's

Mixed

References

External links

Living people
1999 births

Dutch male curlers
Sportspeople from Tilburg
21st-century Dutch people